The 2018 Bogor regency election was held on June 27, 2018, as part of the simultaneous local elections. It was held to elect the regent and deputy regent of Bogor Regency. Elections for members of the municipal council (Dewan Perwakilan Rakyat Daerah) will be held in 2019.

Incumbent regent, Nurhayanti, while eligible, has decided not to run for re-election. In total, five candidates were on the election ballot: three party candidate pairs and two independent candidate pairs. Municipal councilor and sister of a former regent, Ade Yasin, defeated fellow councilor, Ade Ruhandi, and the other 4 candidates.

Candidates
The candidates, along with their supporting parties, are as follows:

Results

The results were announced on July 6, 2018. The winner, Ade Yasin, is a former municipal councilor for the regency and is the chairman for West Java's branch of the United Development Party.

Aftermath
Following the announcement, the Ade Ruhandi/Inggrid Kansil pair filed a lawsuit to the Constitutional Court of Indonesia. Although the lawsuit was eventually turned down, it resulted in a delay for the swearing in of the regent-elect, which was moved to March 2019.

References

2018 Indonesian local elections
Bogor Regency
Regency elections in Indonesia
Elections in West Java